Trần Quyết Lập (12 December 1974 – 17 March 2016) was a Vietnamese rock musician, best known as the lead singer of rock band Bức Tường.

Personal life 
Lập was born the youngest in a large poor family. He began his artistic career with technical grade vocal performances at the Department of Theater, Hanoi College of Art from 1993 to 1997. He graduated from the Department of Economics, Vietnam National University, Hanoi in 2001. In 1994, he and friends formed the rock band Bức Tường. He served as the frontman of the group from until its dissolution in 2006. He wrote more than 30 songs, notably the song "". The group developed a large number of fans in Vietnam. He was one of the four judges of The Voice of Vietnam for the first three seasons.

In February 2016, Lập was diagnosed with colorectal cancer and metastasized. After a period of treatment at the Vietnam – Germany Hospital, he was taken home to be cared for by his family. On 17 March 2016, Lập died at his home, not long after his 42nd birthday.

Recognition 
 Excellent Student band SV 96 – VTV3
 Student rock band impressive 96 – Student Newspaper Vietnam
 1998 Outlook band – Vietnamese Student Association
 The band has the most impressive albums of 2001
 Special band 2002 – contemporary VTV1
 Commission for contemporary music festival in the Republic of France
 Band of cultural events in Vietnam 2003 – The Newspaper voted
 The most successful band 2004 – The Newspaper voted
 Excellent Hardrock band Congress Rock English I – 2004
 The band has made numerous contributions to the Vietnamese rock scene −2004
 Successful band – The public VCTV – 2005
 Character of the Year – VTV Awards – 2016

Other social activities 

 Special Characters with "Tomorrow you and I" of the UN
 MC for Hanoi channel TV (Games show Overcoming Challenges (Vietnamese version of The Vault).
 Goodwill Ambassador of the AFC.
 Organization of production programs music and sports events.
 Technical Advisor and comment directly Festival VN Super Band 2007
 Editing and Rainbow Live Show performances Italy-Piero Pelu 'live in the Philippines.
 Technical Advisor and comment directly to Tiger Translate - Rock your passion 2007
 Members BGK music festival "Sing passion" Youth 2008
 Total directed, edited and performed trans-Vietnam Tour: ROCK STORM.

References

External links 
 Tran Lap: The turning point came ... at a standstill one
 Trần Lập qua đời

1974 births
2016 deaths
Deaths from cancer in Vietnam
Deaths from colorectal cancer
People from Nam Định
21st-century Vietnamese male singers
20th-century Vietnamese male singers